The A25 (Portuguese: Autoestrada das Beiras Litoral e Alta) is a major motorway (freeway) in Portugal. It connects Aveiro, in the west coast, to Vilar Formoso, near the Portugal–Spain border, and serves other important cities like Viseu and Guarda. A25 is operated by Ascendi Costa de Prata, Auto Estradas da Costa de Prata, S. A.

External links 

Motorways in Portugal